Chanchai Acadium is an indoor sporting arena, located in Bangkokthonburi University, Bangkok, Thailand. The seating capacity of the arena is 6,000 spectators and it was built in 2012 for the 2012 AFF Futsal Championship.

It is used mainly for concerts, boxing, basketball, futsal, and volleyball.

External links
Profile at bkkthon.ac.th 
Arena information

Indoor arenas in Thailand
Sports venues completed in 2012
Sports venues in Bangkok
2012 establishments in Thailand
Basketball venues in Thailand
Volleyball venues in Thailand